Heidrun Huwyler (1942) is a Swiss German Post-Impressionist painter.

Biography
Works by Heidrun Huwyler show a broad spectrum of artistic talents. Her abstract images are simultaneously emotional and spontaneous by showing colors on in several layers. Her technique is mainly influenced by informalism or "art informel" with origin in Paris. She lived and worked in Switzerland, Germany and South Africa. African inspiration is suggested by the choice of her motifs.

References

1942 births
Artists from Freiburg im Breisgau
Living people
20th-century Swiss painters
21st-century Swiss painters
Post-impressionist painters
Swiss women painters